The 2014 All-Ireland Senior Ladies' Football Championship is the 41st edition of the Ladies' Gaelic Football Association's premier inter-county Ladies' Gaelic football tournament. It is known for sponsorship reasons as the TG4 All-Ireland Senior Ladies' Football Championship. It will commence on 26 July 2014.

Fixtures

Qualifying rounds

Finals

References

!